Xaver Unsinn (29 November 1929 – 4 January 2012) was a German ice hockey player and coach. His greatest success was winning the bronze medal at the 1976 Winter Olympics as coach of the German national team. He also competed at the 1952 and 1960 Winter Olympics.

Unsinn was coach of the German national team on three occasions, 1964, 1975 to 1977 and, again, from 1981 to 1990, coaching the team in 221 internationals.

As a player, he spent most of his career with the EV Füssen, which he won eight national German championships with. As a club coach he also won three German and one Swiss national championships with the Düsseldorfer EG, Berliner SC and SC Bern.

He is a member of the IIHF Hall of Fame and has also been awarded the Order of Merit of the Federal Republic of Germany.

He died on 4 January 2012.

References

1929 births
2012 deaths
German ice hockey coaches
West German ice hockey forwards
Germany men's national ice hockey team coaches
Ice hockey players at the 1952 Winter Olympics
Ice hockey players at the 1960 Winter Olympics
IIHF Hall of Fame inductees
Olympic ice hockey players of Germany
Sportspeople from Füssen
Recipients of the Cross of the Order of Merit of the Federal Republic of Germany
Olympic ice hockey players of the United Team of Germany
German ice hockey forwards
West German expatriate sportspeople in Switzerland
West German ice hockey coaches